Rag Doll (Peter Merkel Jr.) is a fictional character, a supervillain and anti-hero in the DC Comics universe. He first appeared in Villains United #1 (July 2005), and was created by Gail Simone and Dale Eaglesham. He is a member of the Secret Six and the son of the original Rag Doll, Peter Merkel.

Fictional character biography
A new Rag Doll was featured in the Villains United miniseries, as a member of a small group calling themselves the "Secret Six" who hoped to rival the new Secret Society of Super Villains. It was revealed he is the son of the original Rag Doll and was born a normal baby. To please his father, he underwent surgery to implant lubricated cybernetic joints that let him emulate his father's physique. The surgery left him badly disfigured and requiring regular doses of an emollient to lubricate his skin – otherwise his bones will cut through his brittle flesh. He also had surgically removed his genitals, which he considered a "bother".

The new Rag Doll also had a strange relationship with a Parademon, who referred to Rag Doll as "Clown". How the Parademon had been separated from Apokolips remains unclear. It considered itself the Rag Doll's guard-dog, threatening to hurt or kill anyone who even inconvenienced the Rag Doll, despite his protests. The Parademon died, however, detonating ten Mother Boxes to cover the Secret Six's escape during a battle with the Society.

He briefly battled his father, the original Rag Doll (who was representing the Society). This was just prior to the original Rag Doll abandoning the Society and rejoining the Injustice Society (which led to his eventual death). Their battle was cut short by the intervention of the Parademon.

Rag Doll next pushes Parademon replacement Mad Hatter off the roof of Vandal Savage's stronghold, claiming there is only room for one freak on the team.

Rag Doll next appears on with new sixth member Harley Quinn, retrieving a box that is later revealed to contain the deceased Justice League member Ice. The Birds of Prey retrieve Ice's body and the Six escape unpaid.

Doctor Psycho later uses his powers to cause Rag Doll to attack his teammates.

The Six, with new members Jeannette and Bane, are hired to retrieve a card that supposedly gets its owner out of Hell "free". They are attacked by many supervillains who want the card, most acting under orders from Junior, a mysterious mob boss who controls the West Coast. In a confrontation, it is revealed that Junior is actually Rag Doll's sister Alex, who (after implied sexual abuse from their father) mutilated herself horrifically to "bring the ugly out where I can look at it".

Catman, Bane, and Rag Doll (who is disguised as Robin) go to Gotham City after the death of Batman and kill members of a crime ring that goes after rich peoples' children, but Nightwing shows up at the last house and sends them all away.

After Bane declares himself the new leader of the Six and fires Scandal, the sixth member becomes Black Alice, a Goth teen with the power to copy the abilities of magic users across the Universe. After Alice infiltrates a cult and is uncovered, Rag Doll saves her life and she begins a flirtation with him, much to Bane's chagrin. Catman's son is targeted for murder, all of the pre-existing team members leave the Six to help Catman after he steals their plane, leaving Bane and Jeanette to create a temporary Six until the others return. On their journey to South Africa to try to find Catman, he is very shocked to discover that Alice does indeed consider Rag Doll to be her boyfriend, and attacks Scandal in the mistaken belief that she wants him, despite Scandal's lesbianism. Alice summons Etrigan's powers to fight Scandal, but promptly gives up, turning back to normal in tears. She explains that she knows Rag Doll does not like her like that (especially with the knowledge that she is unaware of his lack of reproductive organs), but acted out simply from the strain and guilt of having given her father cancer by mistake. Rag Doll attempts to offer her comfort, and when Deadshot takes it as an attempt to flirt with her, Rag Doll actually stands up straight (literally and figuratively) for the first time, defending Alice.

Rag Doll later accompanies the rest of the Secret Six when they go to Oolong Island in order to defeat the Doom Patrol and take over the island. He nearly kills Negative Man, but is defeated after being attacked by a seagull. While leaving the island, it is revealed that Rag Doll had captured Bumblebee and kept her bound and gagged in his pocket. Before Rag Doll could leave the island with his taped-up "souvenir", Bumblebee was taken from him by Elasti-Girl.

It was later revealed that the Get Out Of Hell Free card that the Six had obtained (which Scandal claimed to have lost, when in reality she was keeping it to resurrect Knockout), had been stolen from Scandal's safe, and Scandal correctly deduced the only one capable of stealing it was Rag Doll. When Scandal confronts and almost kills him, Rag Doll reveals to her he stole the card hoping to use it to revive Parademon, saying that Scandal's choice to use it for Knockout (Scandal's "one heart") was misled and selfish. He then uses the card to transport himself to Hell and set an ambush as his teammates were sure to follow. He explains that due to his emerging protectiveness of Black Alice, he had fled partly because of his fear of finally gaining a measure of sanity. He discovered after arriving that, due to being born without a soul, he was prophesied to rule in Hell, commanding a legion of demons and being given a fiancé (revealed to be Knockout) by Blaze herself. After the Six decide to fight (half of them being forced to owing to Deadshot shooting Rag Doll in the head) for Knockout rather than becoming lords of the Underworld at Merkel's side, Blaze herself intervenes. After Rag Doll decides that Scandal's love is more important than his friendship with Parademon (who as it turns out enjoys Hell due to his similar upbringing on Apokolips), the team departs with Knockout in tow.

Following Bane's decisions to retake Gotham, starting by eliminating several of Batman's closest allies, they are betrayed by the Penguin who was forcibly recruited due to his knowledge of Gotham's inner workings. A small army of superheroes arrive at the warehouse the Six are operating out of, and when given the choice to surrender they immediately fall to infighting. Rag Doll is the only one to understand that they have to stand together because they deserve each other. Deciding to go down fighting, they all ingest Venom, which Bane as a recovered user still carries. After a short but brutal battle in which they injure or knock out multiple heroes, the entire Secret Six is taken down with brutal force.

The New 52
In The New 52 rebooted timeline, Peter Merkel Jr. first appears as an inmate of Arkham Asylum. He is later hired to "kill" Barbara Gordon's roommate, Alysia, and her friends, under the pretense that they are eco-terrorists. Operating as Rag Doll, he pursues Alysia, but Batgirl stops him and beats him. During the confrontation, Rag Doll realized the whole situation is a set-up and he reveals that he actually did not kill anyone. Later, he confronts his employer for lying to him and strangles him to death.

Relationships
As a member of the Secret Six, he had formed a bond with Parademon. After Parademon was killed, Rag Doll had his upper torso stuffed and keeps it in his room at the House of Secrets.

He also says he has a sister he once French-kissed but talking to Parademon's stuffed body is less socially awkward. Despite lacking genitals, he also apparently planned on having sex with a nurse who gave him her phone number, and it was suggested that he derived physical pleasure from being beaten by Manhunter.

Rag Doll spends his share of the Six's loot on constructing a monkey house and purchases 'cute little monkey outfits' that resemble the costumes of the Secret Six for the small pack of monkeys that live in his room.

Rag Doll has also mentioned that his father was "not a kind man", and was disappointed in the fact that only his brother inherited the family gift. His surgeries to transform himself were done to please his disapproving father. However, during their brief confrontation, the elder Rag Doll chastised his son, saying that his son's surgeries were inferior to his own natural talents.

In Secret Six (vol. 2) #2, it is revealed that his first name is Peter.

In #5, it was revealed that the villainous Junior, a villain who has control of the entire West Coast mob, and has the entire supervillain community at their beck and call (out of fear) is actually Peter's sister. In #6, Junior's real name is Alex (so named because Rag Doll Sr. "wanted another boy", which would seem to clash with Rag Doll Jr.'s previous mention of his brother). Though it is not stated outright, Alex heavily implies that Rag Doll Sr. sexually assaulted her as a child, and that is why she mutilated herself, to "bring the ugly out where she could look at it".

Powers and abilities
Through a series of surgeries, Rag Doll had his biological joints replaced with artificial ones. These joints allow him to bend, compress, and contort in ways even master contortionists cannot. Rag Doll requires a special emollient to keep his artificial joints from tearing through his skin. He often wields a knife and is an adequate hand-to-hand fighter.

Other versions

Flashpoint
In the alternate timeline of the Flashpoint event, Rag Doll works as a contortionist in the freak show in Haly's Circus. During the attack of the Amazons, Rag Doll is rescued by Resistance member Vertigo. When looking for reinforcements, Rag Doll is killed by an Amazon by breaking Rag Doll's back over her knee. It was unclear whether this Rag Doll had undergone surgery to perform his contortions, or had been born with the talent.

References

Characters created by Dale Eaglesham
Characters created by Gail Simone
Comics characters introduced in 2005
DC Comics male supervillains
Fictional contortionists